Seaford College is an independent co-educational boarding and day school at East Lavington, south of Petworth, West Sussex, England. Founded in 1884, it is a member of the Headmasters' and Headmistresses' Conference. The college is in Lavington Park, a  Area of Outstanding Natural Beauty in the South Downs. The land is owned by a charitable trust and the site is run by the Board of Governors who are the trustees. The college is the inspiration for the Jennings and Darbishire children's books, written by alumnus Anthony Buckeridge.

History

The College was founded at Corsica Hall, Seaford on the East Sussex coast, in 1884 by Colonel Frederick Savage, who also served as headmaster from 1884 until 1920. In 1940, the College was disrupted by a government order requisitioning all boarding school premises in Seaford and giving only six weeks in which to find a safe home elsewhere. The College was evacuated to Worthing for the duration of World War II, and once peace had resumed, the new Headmaster Canon Charles Johnson began to look for a more suitable site, the College having outgrown its original premises in Seaford. In 1946 the decision was made to buy the estate at Lavington Park and the school moved to its current location. As of the academic year 2022/23 Senior School day fees are approximately £25,000 per year, with Senior School boarding fees approximately £38,000, though a number of bursaries and scholarships are available.

The main school building, previously Lavington Park country house, is a Grade II* listed building.

School features

In the 2010 GCSE results 87.5% of the school's pupils achieved five or more passes at grades A* to C, with 73 per cent of pupils achieving five or more passes at the higher grades including English and maths.

Old Seafordians

Politics
Ahmed Chalabi, President of the Iraqi Governing Council (2003) and Deputy Prime Minister of Iraq

Arts
Anthony Buckeridge , children's author
Lance Dossor, pianist
Val Guest, film director
Gareth Neame , television producer
Tom Odell, singer
Matthew Rose, opera singer
Toby Stephens, actor

Sport
Luc Benkenstein, Essex cricketer
Mats Grambusch, Olympic medal-winning field hockey player
Tom Grambusch, Olympic medal-winning field hockey player
Jeremy Groome, Sussex cricketer
Adrian Jones, Sussex and Somerset cricketer
David Purley, Formula One driver
Christopher Rühr, Olympic medal-winning field hockey player

Other
Hugh Bentall, pioneer of open-heart surgery
Sir Louis Blom-Cooper, lawyer and chairman of the Press Council
Uri Dadush, economist
Sir Roger De Haan , chairman of Saga Group
Derek Marks, editor of the Daily Express (1965–1971)

Headmasters of Seaford

Colonel Frederick Savage (1884–1920)
L.S.A Cowan (1920–1928)
The Revd John Macnutt (1928–1931)
The Revd William Hindley (1931–1935)
W. Leslie Land (1935–1944)
The Revd Charles Johnson (1944–1990)
Charles Hannaford (1990–1996)
Toby Mullins (1997–2013)
John Green (2013–present)

Notable associations
Constantine II of Greece – patron
George I of Greece – patron
George II of Greece – patron
Paul of Greece – patron
Richard Chaloner, 1st Baron Gisborough – Chairman of Governors
Bill Cuthbertson – housemaster
Harold Maxwell-Lefroy – assistant master

References

External links
 Seaford College website
 Old Seafordians website
 Ofsted

Coordinates: 

Educational institutions established in 1884
Member schools of the Headmasters' and Headmistresses' Conference
Boarding schools in West Sussex
Private schools in West Sussex
1884 establishments in England
 
Grade II* listed buildings in West Sussex